Pieter Merkus (18 March 1787 – 2 August 1844) was a Dutch colonial administrator and Governor-General of the Dutch East Indies from 1841 to 1844. He also served as governor of the Molucca Islands.

References

External links 
 

1787 births
1844 deaths
People from Naarden
Governors-General of the Dutch East Indies